The Archbishop of Dublin is an archepiscopal title which takes its name after Dublin, Ireland. Since the Reformation, there have been parallel apostolic successions to the title: one in the Catholic Church and the other in the Church of Ireland. The archbishop of each denomination also holds the title of Primate of Ireland.

History
The diocese of Dublin was formally established by Sigtrygg (Sitric) Silkbeard, King of Dublin in 1028, and the first bishop, Dúnán, was consecrated in about the same year. The diocese of Dublin was subject to the Province of Canterbury until 1152. At the Synod of Kells, held in March 1152, Dublin was raised to an ecclesiastical province with the archbishop of Dublin having the jurisdiction over the bishops of Ferns, Glendalough, Kildare, Leighlin and Ossory. In 1214, the dioceses of Dublin and Glendalough were united, which was confirmed by Pope Innocent III on 25 February 1216 and by Pope Honorius III on 6 October 1216. After the Reformation, there are apostolic successions of Church of Ireland and Roman Catholic archbishops.

In the Church of Ireland
From 1846 to 1977, the Church of Ireland diocese of Dublin and Glendalough was united with the see of Kildare. The current Church of Ireland archbishop is the Most Reverend Michael Jackson, Archbishop of the Diocese of Dublin and Glendalough.

In the Catholic Church
Sometime after the Reformation, Glendalough was dropped from the Catholic archdiocese title. The current Catholic archbishop is the Most Reverend Dermot Farrell, Archbishop of the Archdiocese of Dublin, who was appointed to the title on 29 December 2020 and installed at St Mary's Pro-Cathedral, Dublin on 2 February 2021.

Pre-Reformation bishops and archbishops

Archbishops during the Reformation

Post-Reformation archbishops

Church of Ireland succession

Roman Catholic succession

See also
Primate of Ireland, a title held by each of the archbishops of Dublin
Primate of All Ireland, a title held by each of the archbishops of Armagh

Notes

References

External links
A brief history. Diocese of Dublin and Glendalough (Church of Ireland).

 
 
Dublin
Dublin
 Archbishops